Onsager  may refer to:

 Lars Onsager, a Norwegian–American physical chemist and theoretical physicist
 Onsager reciprocal relations, certain relations between flows and forces in thermodynamic systems